Ramariopsis pulchella is a species of coral fungus in the family Clavariaceae. Originally named Clavaria pulchella by Jean Louis Émile Boudier in 1887, the species was transferred to Ramariopsis by E.J.H. Corner in 1950. The fungus has a cosmopolitan distribution.

References

External links

Clavariaceae
Fungi described in 1887
Fungi of Australia
Fungi of Europe
Fungi of North America